Robert Jachimowicz (born 7 June 1967) is a Paralympian athlete from Poland competing in category F53 throwing events. He has competed at one Summer Paralympics, in Sydney 2000 and at the 2015 IPC Athletics World Championships in Doha he won the silver medal in the discus throw.

Personal history
Jachimowicz was born in Koszalin, Poland in 1967. He is married and has one son.

Career history
Jachimowicz first came to note as an athlete when he competed at the 2000 Summer Paralympics in the F51 Discus throw. He was originally declared the gold medal winner after throwing over 18 metres, but the British Paralympic team, whose athlete Stephen Miller placed fourth, lodged a complaint about Jachimowicz's disability classification. He was disqualified and did not record a placing.

He next competed at the 2002 IPC Athletics World Championships, competing in both the shot put and discus but failed to complete either event. After an extended absence for the sport, Jachimowicz represented Poland at the 2014 IPC Athletics European Championships in Swansea, taking the silver medal. He took a second silver a year later, this time at the 2015 World Championships in Doha, despite struggling with injury.

In 2016, in the buildup to the Summer Paralympics in Rio, he travelled to Grosseto in Italy to compete in his second European Championships. A throw of 19.42 was enough to give him the gold medal in the discus.

References

External links
 

1967 births
Living people
People from Koszalin
Paralympic athletes of Poland
Polish male discus throwers
Polish male shot putters
Athletes (track and field) at the 2000 Summer Paralympics
Athletes (track and field) at the 2016 Summer Paralympics
Athletes (track and field) at the 2020 Summer Paralympics
Wheelchair discus throwers
Wheelchair shot putters
Paralympic discus throwers
Paralympic shot putters
21st-century Polish people